Hypnotic Suggestion EP is the second EP by The Apples in Stereo. The record was released in 1994.

The EP's four tracks were later re-released on 1996 compilation album Science Faire, after the release of the band's debut full-length LP Fun Trick Noisemaker.

Track listing
All tracks written by Robert Schneider except where noted.

Side One
 "Running In Circles" – 2:29
 "Hypnotic Suggestion" – 2:09
Side Two
 "Touch The Water" (J. McIntyre) – 2:10
 "Glowworm" – 2:42

Personnel

The Apples in Stereo
Hilarie Sidney – drums, acoustic guitar, backing vocals
Jim McIntyre – electric bass, lead vocals on "Touch the Water"
Robert Schneider – lead vocals, acoustic and electric guitars, keyboards

Additional performers
John Hill – chorus member

Production
Hypnotic Suggestion was produced by Robert Schneider and recorded from December 1993 to February 1994 on four-track tape machines at The Elephant 6 Recording Co. The album was mastered by Paul Brekus, Aardvark Records, Denver, Colorado. All art for the album was created by Will Cullen Hart.

External links
Album art and liner notes at Optical Atlas

The Apples in Stereo albums
1994 EPs
The Elephant 6 Recording Company EPs